Andi Djemma (15 January 1901 – 23 February 1965) was a king of Luwu in South Sulawesi and Indonesian nationalist who later supported inclusion of his own kingdom to the newly formed Indonesian Republic.

Early life 
He was born in Palopo, 15 January 1901 from Luwu royal family. He attended Inlandsche School, a native Indonesian school in Luwu for five years then continued his education informally, educated by his own family inside royal court. He was frequently invited to attend meeting between colonial officials and royal administrative officials by his mother, where he would develop his political thoughts and interest in Indonesian nationalism. Andi became a district official in 1919 and was placed in several districts in South Sulawesi such as Ngapa and Ware. However, he was fired from his position in 1931 for his alleged connections and secretly funding Indonesian nationalist organization in the region.

He was nominated as one of successor for king of Luwu following his father's death. Among twelve candidates, three left after consideration by royal council. Dutch government was worried of Andi's rise to the position, but despite that, he was chosen due to Andi's supporters threatened to start a conflict if he was not elected.

National Revolution 
After Japanese occupation of Dutch East Indies and Proclamation of Indonesian Independence, he contacted Sam Ratulangi, then-governor of newly formed Sulawesi province to discuss about Indonesian Republic position and decided to support the republic establishment. He later formed a paramilitary organization named Soekarno Moeda  (lit: Young Sukarno). He negotiated and convinced other traditional rulers in the region to support Indonesian Republic and reject any cooperation with Netherlands Indies Civil Administration. His paramilitary would later became under his own son, Andi Makkalau and attacked several Japanese positions to steal its weapons.

On 21 January 1946, Andi sent ultimatum to all Dutch officials to leave Luwu region in 48 hours after an incident involving destruction of a mosque by Royal Netherlands East Indies Army, or else that all Dutch officials would be massacred. This ultimatum was ignored and widespread attack started on 23 January 1946 involving Royal Netherlands East Inies Army and also Australian army who also got attacked by militias. This would be followed by South Sulawesi campaign of 1946–1947, and Andi would be arrested by the Dutch on 3 July 1946 and exiled to Ternate. He was sentenced to death but reduced to 25 years imprisonment and soon released after Dutch–Indonesian Round Table Conference.

He stayed on his position as king of Luwu and a civil servant until he died on 23 February 1965.

Awards and legacy 
He was awarded Satyalacana Karya on 1964. On 2002, he was posthumously awarded title National Heroes of Indonesia. A street in Makassar was named after him, a university in Palopo, and also Andi Jemma Airport.

References

National Heroes of Indonesia
1901 births
1965 deaths